Lingual swelling may refer to:

 Lateral lingual swelling
 Tuberculum impar, also known as median lingual swelling